The 1979–80 Australian region cyclone season was an above average tropical cyclone season.

Seasonal summary

Systems

Tropical Cyclone Tony 

On 26 August, TCWC Perth reported that a tropical low had developed on a shear line about 1300 km (810 mi) to the northwest of Cocos Island. Over the next couple of days the depression gradually developed further before at 1800 UTC on 27 August, TCWC Perth estimated that it had become a tropical cyclone and named it Tony. During the next couple of days, the system moved towards the west-southwest before on 29 August it reached its peak intensity of 95 km/h (60 mph) and a peak pressure of 990 hPa (29.23 inHg) as it approached the edge of TCWC Perth's area of responsibility. During the next day, Tony moved into the South West Indian Ocean and weakened gradually before it dissipated during 31 August. Neither the Mauritius or Reunion meteorological services monitored Tony as a tropical cyclone while it was active, while it was not included in the JTWC's analysis of the season.

Severe Tropical Cyclone Viola-Claudette 

A tropical depression developed on 9 December, moved slowly southwestward, and strengthened into Cyclone Viola two days later. Early on 18 December, Viola crossed 90º E and was renamed Claudette.

Severe Tropical Cyclone Wilf-Danitza

Tropical Cyclone Paul 

On 2 January, the BoM reported that a tropical depression had developed in the Southwest Gulf of Carpentaria. During that day the depression moved towards the southwest and developed early signs of having a cyclonic circulation, however before it could intensify into a tropical cyclone, the system made landfall near the Northern Territory border with Queensland at 135°E. Over the next couple of days the depression weakened slightly, as it moved in a general east-southeast direction across the Carpentaria and Central Coast districts of Queensland. On 7 January, the depression moved out into the Coral Sea just to the south of Sarina with a central pressure of 995 hPa. During that day the depression developed gale-force windspeeds and was named as Paul by TCWC Brisbane. Before later that day, Paul reached its peak intensity as a tropical cyclone with 10-minute sustained windspeeds of 75 km/h (45 mph) and its lowest central pressure of 989 hPa as it moved rapidly towards the southeast. This southeastern movement continued until 1200 UTC on 8 January when it slowed down and started to move to the southwest as it developed a cold core and became extratropical. The extratropical remnants of Paul subsequently lingered in the Australian region and peaked with stronger windspeeds than when it was a tropical cyclone. The US Navy's analysis of this system shows that they would have considered Paul a tropical storm with peak 1-minute sustained windspeeds of 110 km/h (70 mph). As a tropical depression, Paul forced a strong area of convergence in the moist airstream onto the tropical Queensland coast. As a result of the moisture, very heavy rain caused one of the highest floods of the 20th Century down the Don River through Bowen. In its lower reaches the river changed its course and washed away two homes and caused several million Australian dollars worth of damage to the market garden industry.

Severe Tropical Cyclone Amy 

Cyclone Amy was the strongest storm of the season.

Severe Tropical Cyclone Brian

Tropical Cyclone Clara

Severe Tropical Cyclone Dean

Tropical Cyclone Ruth

Severe Tropical Cyclone Enid

Severe Tropical Cyclone Fred 

On 19 February, TCWC Perth reported that a tropical depression had developed out of an active area of convection that was associated with a monsoonal shear line about midway between the Cocos and Christmas Islands.

Fred developed from an active area of convection associated with the monsoon shear line about midway between Cocos and Christmas Islands late on 19 February 1980. It reached tropical cyclone strength early on 21 February 1980 and attained its maximum intensity on the afternoon of 24 February 1980 when the central pressure was estimated to be near 930 hPa. Despite the small size of the cyclone it maintained this intensity with minor fluctuations until about 1200 UTC 25 February 1980. Early on 26 February the direction of movement changed from southwestward to southward as Fred came under the influence of a northwesterly upper-level flow. It weakened rapidly as it moved into a strong ridge of high pressure located at about latitude 33°S.

Severe Tropical Cyclone Simon

Severe Tropical Cyclone Doris-Gloria

Unnamed Tropical Cyclone (27P) 

On 27 March, TCWC Darwin reported that a tropical depression had developed in the Gulf of Carpentraria about 300 km (190 mi) to the southwest of Wallaby island. During that day the system intensified enough to produce localized and intermittent gale-force winds, over the northeast Arnhem land as it moved into the Arafura sea. Early on 28 March, TCWC Darwin reported that despite the depression having reached cyclone intensity of 65 km/h (40 mph), it was not a tropical cyclone as the system had not developed a "deep convective warm cored structure". However, during post storm analysis TCWC Darwin reported that the depression had become a tropical cyclone at 0000 UTC (0800 WST) on 28 March. During 28 March, the system moved towards the north, before during the next day as the cyclone turned towards the west and moved into the Arafura sea it reached its lowest central pressure of 998 hPa (29.47 inHg). As the system moved further into the Arafura sea, a very strong amount of vertical windshear and an intrusion of dry air made the cyclone rapidly weaken into a tropical depression before the residual depression dissipated on 31 March just to the north of the Cobourg peninsular. The Cyclone caused no deaths and only minor damage was reported to have occurred.

Other systems 
During 11 March the precursor tropical low to Severe Tropical Cyclone Sina, moved south-westwards into the region from the South Pacific. The system subsequently developed into a tropical cyclone and was named Sina by the BoM, before it moved south-eastwards out of the region early the next day.

Seasonal effects 

|-
| Tony ||  || bgcolor=#| || bgcolor=#| || bgcolor=#| || None || None || None || None ||
|-
| Simon ||  || bgcolor=#|Category 4 severe tropical cyclone || bgcolor=#| || bgcolor=#| || Queensland, New Zealand ||  ||  ||  ||
|}

See also 

 Atlantic hurricane seasons: 1979, 1980
 Eastern Pacific hurricane seasons: 1979, 1980
 Western Pacific typhoon seasons: 1979, 1980
 North Indian Ocean cyclone seasons: 1979, 1980

References 

 
Australian region cyclone seasons
Aust
Articles which contain graphical timelines
 disasters in Australia
 disasters in Australia
 disasters in Oceania
 disasters in Oceania